Holkar Science College, officially Government Model Autonomous Holkar Science College, also known as Holkar College is an institute in Indore, Madhya Pradesh.It was established on 10 June 1891 by His Highness Maharajadhiraja Raj Rajeshwar Sawai Shri Sir Shivaji Rao Holkar Bahadur XII, the erstwhile ruler of Indore belonging to the Holkar dynasty of the Marathas. The biggest government science institute in the state, has been ranked third among government autonomous colleges in the country by Education World Rankings 2020-21.

In the year 1985, the Government Holkar Science College, Indore was awarded the title of a Model College by the state Government of Madhya Pradesh and in the year 1988 the college earned the status of an autonomous college.

Campus

Holkar College campus is located in the South area of East Indore. It is situated in an area between known as Bhanwar Kua which has a high concentration of cultural and academic institutions, including the Indore University, Central Museum, Institute of Management Studies, Cystal IT Park and the Kamla Nehru Zoological Park. The Holkar College HSC has multiple halls throughout the campus along Indore BRTS and various lectures for science students are conducted within these halls, some major buildings are including the Main Building, Red Building, Yeshwant Hall and Chemistry Block Building.

Faculties and Departments
The College has Chemistry and Physics departments. The institute receives funds from the state but is autonomous with regards to administration and conduct of examinations. The HSC offers a number of courses in the field of science. HSC's research and teaching is organised within a network of faculties and academic departments which includes:

 Department of Biochemistry
 Department of Bioinformatics
 Department of Biotechnology & Bioinformatics
 Department of Botany
 Department of Chemistry
 Department of Computer Science
The Department of Computer Science was established in academic year 2000–2001. It is an autonomous department under Govt. Holkar Science College affiliated DAVV, Indore.
 Department of Electronics
 Department of Entrepreneurship
 Department of Fisheries
 Department of forensic science
 Department of Geology
 Department of Language
 Department of Mathematics
 Department of Microbiology
 Department of Pharmaceutical Chemistry
 Department of Physics
 Department of Seed Technology
 Department of Statistics
 Department of Zoology

Admission is restricted to students domicile to Madhya Pradesh.

References

External links
 Official website

Universities and colleges in Indore
Science and technology in Indore
Educational institutions established in 1891
1891 establishments in India
Buildings and structures in Indore